Salutogenesis is the study of the origins of health and focuses on factors that support human health and well-being, rather than on factors that cause disease (pathogenesis). More specifically, the "salutogenic model" was originally concerned with the relationship between health, stress, and coping through a study of Holocaust survivors. Despite going through the dramatic tragedy of the holocaust, some survivors were able to thrive later in life. The discovery that there must be powerful health causing factors led to the development of salutogenesis. The term was coined by Aaron Antonovsky (1923-1994), a professor of medical sociology. The salutogenic question posed by Aaron Antonovsky is, "How can this person be helped to move toward greater health?" 

Antonovsky's theories reject the "traditional medical-model dichotomy separating health and illness". He described the relationship as a continuous variable, what he called the "health-ease versus dis-ease continuum". Salutogenesis now encompasses more than the origins of health and has evolved to be about multidimensional causes of higher levels of health. Models associated with salutogenesis generally include wholistic approaches related to at least the physical, social, emotional, spiritual, intellectual, vocational, and environmental dimensions.

Derivation
The word "salutogenesis" comes from the Latin salus (meaning health) and the Greek genesis (meaning origin). Antonovsky developed the term from his studies of "how people manage stress and stay well" (unlike pathogenesis which studies the causes of diseases). He observed that stress is ubiquitous, but not all individuals have negative health outcomes in response to stress. Instead, some people achieve health despite their exposure to potentially disabling stress factors.

Development 
In his 1979 book, Health, Stress and Coping,  Antonovsky described a variety of influences that led him to the question of how people survive, adapt, and overcome in the face of even the most punishing life-stress experiences. In his 1987 book, Unraveling the Mysteries of Health, he focused more specifically on a study of women and aging; he found that 29% of women who had survived Nazi concentration camps had positive emotional health, compared to 51% of a control group. His insight was that  29% of the survivors were not emotionally impaired  by the stress. Antonovsky wrote: "this for me was the dramatic experience that consciously set me on the road to formulating what I came to call the 'salutogenic model'."

In salutogenic theory, people continually battle with the effects of hardship. These ubiquitous forces are called generalized resource deficits (GRDs). On the other hand, there are generalized resistance resources (GRRs), which are all of the resources that help a person cope and are effective in avoiding or combating a range of psychosocial stressors. Examples are resources such as money, ego-strength, and social support.

Generalized resource deficits will cause the coping mechanisms to fail whenever the sense of coherence is not robust to weather the current situation. This causes illness and possibly even death. However, if the sense of coherence is high, a stressor will not necessarily be harmful. But it is the balance between generalized resource deficits and resources that determines whether a factor will be pathogenic, neutral, or salutary.

Antonovsky's formulation was that the generalized resistance resources enabled individuals to make sense of and manage events. He argued that over time, in response to positive experiences provided by successful use of different resources, an individual would develop an attitude that was "in itself the essential tool for coping".

Sense of coherence 

The "sense of coherence" is a theoretical formulation that provides a central explanation for the role of stress in human functioning. "Beyond the specific stress factors that one might encounter in life, and beyond your perception and response to those events, what determines whether stress will cause you harm is whether or not the stress violates your sense of coherence." Antonovsky defined Sense of Coherence as:

 "a global orientation that expresses the extent to which one has a pervasive, enduring though dynamic feeling of confidence that (1) the stimuli deriving from one's internal and external environments in the course of living are structured, predictable and explicable; (2) the resources are available to one to meet the demands posed by these stimuli; and (3) these demands are challenges, worthy of investment and engagement."

In his formulation, the sense of coherence has three components:
 Comprehensibility:  a belief that things happen in an orderly and predictable fashion and a sense that you can understand events in your life and reasonably predict what will happen in the future.
 Manageability: a belief that you have the skills or ability, the support, the help, or the resources necessary to take care of things,  and that things are manageable and within your control.
 Meaningfulness: a belief that things in life are interesting and a source of satisfaction,  that things are really worthwhile and that there is good reason or purpose to care about what happens.

According to Antonovsky,  the third element is the most important. If a person believes there is no reason to persist and survive and confront challenges, if they have no sense of meaning, then they will have no motivation to comprehend and manage events.  His essential argument is that "salutogenesis" depends on experiencing a strong "sense of coherence".  His research demonstrated that the sense of coherence predicts positive health outcomes.

Fields of application

Health and medicine 
Antonovsky viewed his work as primarily addressed to the fields of health psychology, behavioral medicine, and the sociology of health. It has been adopted as a term to describe contemporary approaches to nursing, psychiatry, integrative medicine, and healthcare architecture. The salutogenic framework has also been adapted as a method for decision making on the fly; the method has been applied for emergency care and for healthcare architecture. Incorporating concepts from salutogenesis can support a transition from curative to preventive medicine.

Workplace 
The sense of coherence with its three components meaningfulness, manageability and understandability has also been applied to the workplace.

Meaningfulness is considered to be related to the feeling of participation and motivation and to a perceived meaning of the work. The meaningfulness component has also been linked with job control and task significance. Job control implies that employees have more authority to make decisions concerning their work and the working process. Task significance involves "the experience of congruence between personal values and work activities, which is accompanied by strong feelings of identification with the attitudes, values or goals of the working tasks and feelings of motivation and involvement".

The manageability component is considered to be linked to job control as well as to access to resources. It has also been considered to be linked with social skills and trust. Social relations relate also to the meaningfulness component.

The comprehensibility component may be influenced by consistent feedback at work, for example concerning the performance appraisal.

Salutogenics perspectives are also considered in the design of offices.

See also

References

Further reading 
 Becker, C. M., Glascoff, M. A., & Felts, W. M. (2010). "Salutogenesis 30 Years Later: Where do we go from here?" International Electronic Journal of Health Education, 13, 25-32. Can access at: http://files.portfolioeducacional.webnode.pt/200000064-08f0a09ea3/Orienta%C3%A7%C3%A3o%20Salutog%C3%A9nica.pdf
 Studying Health vs. Studying Disease - Aaron Antonovsky. Lecture at the Congress for Clinical Psychology and Psychotherapy, Berlin, 19 February 1990.
 Coping with Existential Threats and the Inevitability of Asking for Meaningfulness - Peter Novak. A philosophical perspective
 https://usyd.academia.edu/JanGolembiewski/Papers/290160/Start_Making_Sense - Start Making Sense; Applying a salutogenic model to architectural design for psychiatric care - Jan Golembiewski. A method of applying salutogenic theory.
 Salutogenesis
 Bengt Lindström, "Salutogenesis – an introduction"
 Golembiewski, J. (2012). "Salutogenic design: The neural basis for health promoting environments." World Health Design Scientific Review 5(4): 62-68.https://www.academia.edu/2456916/Salutogenic_design_The_neural_basis_for_health_promoting_environments
 Mayer, C.-H. & Krause, C. (Eds.)(2012): Exploring Mental Health: Theoretical and Empirical Discourses on Salutogenesis. Pabst Science Publishers.
 Mayer, C.-H. & Hausner, s. (Eds.) (2015): Salutogene Aufstellungen. Beitraege zur Gesundheitsfoerderung in der systemischen Arbeit. - Vandenhoeck & Ruprecht
 Mittelmark,M.B., Sagy, S., Eriksson, M. (Eds.) (2016):The Handbook of Salutogenesis.- Springer Publisher.
 Mittelmark, M.B., Sagy, S., Eriksson, M., Bauer, G., Pelikan, J.M., Lindström, B., Espnes, G.A. (Eds.): Comprehensive overview of salutogenesis and its contribution to health promotion theory. https://www.springer.com/us/book/9783319045993

Medical sociology
Positive psychology
Health psychology
Public health
Determinants of health